Jocelyn Brando (November 18, 1919November 27, 2005) was an American actress and writer. She is best known for her role as Katie Bannion in the film noir The Big Heat (1953).

Early life 
Brando, the older sister of Marlon Brando, was born in San Francisco, California. She attended the American Academy of Dramatic Arts.

Career 
Brando came to the stage naturally, first appearing in a theatrical production under the direction of her mother, who was a principal in an Omaha community theater group. Her mother, Dorothy Brando, had given Henry Fonda his start in theater in this same group in October 1925 in the play "You and I". She made her Broadway debut in The First Crocus at the Longacre Theatre on January 2, 1942; the play closed after five performances. Her next appearance on Broadway came two months after her younger brother began his role as Stanley Kowalski in Tennessee Williams' A Streetcar Named Desire.

But even before that, in the fall of 1947, Jocelyn and Marlon became two of the first 50 or so members of New York's newly formed Actors Studio, Jocelyn studying with Elia Kazan, Marlon with Robert Lewis.

On February 18, 1948, she appeared in her second role on Broadway. She played Navy nurse Lieutenant Ann Girard in Mister Roberts, which starred family friend Henry Fonda in the title role. The play was a smash hit, running about three years (1,157 performances).

Brando did not complete the run of the play, appearing in the comedy The Golden State in the 1950-51 season, a flop that lasted only 25 performances, followed by a critically acclaimed but commercially unsuccessful 1952 revival of Eugene O'Neill's Desire Under the Elms, which ran for only 46 performances. Brando later appeared in a Broadway revival of O'Neill's Mourning Becomes Electra.

Back in uniform as a military officer, she made her film debut in Don Siegel's war drama China Venture (1953). When she first arrived in Hollywood, she gave an interview in which she commented on her brother's advice, or lack of it, to her: "Marlon is a sweet fellow, and he works very hard. I asked him for a tip about pictures, and he answered, 'Oh, I just say the words. That's all I know about picture acting.' He probably was smart at that to let me find my own way."

Brando's second film was her best-known role: detective Glenn Ford's wife in Fritz Lang's The Big Heat (1953). She also appeared in supporting roles in two of her brother's films, The Ugly American (1963) and The Chase (1966).

In the late 1960s, Brando joined the cast of the CBS soap opera Love of Life, where she created the role of Mrs. Krakauer, mother of Tess (Toni Bull Bua) and Mickey (Alan Feinstein). On primetime television, she played the recurring role of Mrs. Reeves on Dallas. Other TV series that featured her include Richard Diamond, Private Detective, Alfred Hitchcock Presents, Wagon Train (as Ada Meyers, a lonely woman on the train who finally finds love with an Irish sailor in S6E26’s “The Michael Magoo Story” in 1963; in S1E28’s “The Sally Potter Story” aired April 9, 1958 as Millie Bennett, mother of Johnny Crawford’s Jimmy Bennett; and as Grace Lefton in The Martin Gatsby Story, which aired Oct. 10, 1962), Riverboat, The Virginian, Kojak, and Little House on the Prairie. Her final film role was in Mommie Dearest.

Personal life and death
Brando was divorced from actor Don Hanmer on April 4, 1950. On April 13, 1950, she married author Eliot T. Asinof in Tarrytown, New York. She had two sons, Gahan Hanmer and Martin Asinof. She died at her Santa Monica home on November 27, 2005, at age 86, from natural causes.

Filmography

References

External links 
 
 
 
 

1919 births
2005 deaths
20th-century American actresses
20th-century American poets
20th-century American women writers
Actresses from Illinois
Actresses from Nebraska
Actresses from Santa Monica, California
American film actresses
American stage actresses
American television actresses
American women poets
Brando family
Poets from Illinois
Poets from Nebraska